Sabin is a given name of the following people

 Sabin of Bulgaria, ruler of Bulgaria from 765 to 766
Sabin Bălașa (1932–2008), Romanian painter
Sabin Berthelot (1794–1880), French naturalist and ethnologist
Sabin Bornei (born 1975), Romanian boxer 
Sabin Carr (1904–1983), American pole vaulter
Sabin Chaushev (born 1971), Bulgarian Olympic shooter
Sabin W. Colton (1847–1925), American investor
Sabin Cutaș (1968–), Romanian politician
Sabin Drăgoi (1894–1968), Romanian composer
Sabin-Cosmin Goia (born 1982), Romanian football defender 
Sabin Howard, American classical figurative sculptor
Sabin Ilie (born 1975), Romanian football striker
Sabin Manuilă (1894–1964), Romanian statistician
 Sabin Merino (born 1992), Spanish professional footballer
Sabin Rai (born 1974), Nepali singer and lyricist 
Sabin Strătilă (born 1995), Romanian rugby union full-back 
Sabin Willett (born 1957), American lawyer and novelist

See also
Sabine (given name)

Romanian masculine given names